The New Zealand Intellectual Property Journal is a quarterly law review published by Butterworth since 1995. It is available on LexisNexisNZ and covers intellectual property law. The language of publication is English. The preferred abbreviation is: NZIPJ

See also 
 List of intellectual property law journals

References 

Intellectual property law journals
New Zealand law journals
English-language journals
New Zealand intellectual property law